Mato Stanković (born 28 September 1970 in Dubrovnik, SFR Yugoslavia) is a Croatian futsal coach and former player. He is current coach of the Croatia national futsal team.

Honors

As a player 
 1990-1995 Dalma Split (1. CFNL)
 1995-2000 Split 1700 (1. CFNL)
 Croatian champion 1996/1997
 University futsal world championship, Finland, 1996

As a coach 
 Croatian Champion:
 2000/01 with MNK Split 1700, 2001/02, 2002/03, 2003/04 with Split Gasperov & 2005/06 with Brodosplit Inzenjering
 Croatian Cup:
 2000/2001 with MNK Split 1700, 2001/02, 2002/03, 2004/05 with Split Gasperov & 2005/06 with Brodosplit Inzenjering
 African Futsal Championship:
 2008 with Libya
 Arab Futsal Championship:
 2007, 2008 with Libya
 UEFA Futsal Champions league 3rd place 2001/2002, Mnk Split Gašperov
 UEFA Futsal Champions league 1/4 finale 2002/2003, Mnk Split Gašperov
 UEFA Futsal Champions league 1/4 finale 2003/2004, Mnk Split Gašperov
 UEFA Futsal Champions league 1/8 finale 2005/2006, Mnk Brodosplit inž.
 Assistant coach of Croatian national team 2002-2004
 Coach of Libyan national team 2007-2009
 Winner of African futsal championship (CAF), Tripoli, Libya, 2008
 Winner of Arab futsal championship, Port Said, Egypt, 2009
 Winner of North African futsal championship Tunisia, 2009
 Placement and participation in the WORLD CUP, Brasil, 2008
 Coach of Croatian national team 2010-2012
 Winner of Mediterranean cup in Libya 2010
 EURO 2012 ( European championship in futsal ) in Croatia, SEMI-FINALS

References
Futsal Planet profile

1970 births
Living people
Sportspeople from Dubrovnik
Croatian men's futsal players
Croatian football managers
Futsal coaches